Marxist–Leninist Group Revolution is a communist party in Norway. It is formed in 1987 by former members of Marxist-Leninist League. Marxist–Leninist Group Revolution' had an anti-revisionist stance and was oriented towards Albania. The group is an active member of the International Conference of Marxist-Leninist Parties and Organizations (Unity & Struggle)

Marxist–Leninist Group Revolution published the magazine Revolution! until this was taken over by Communist Platform. They were cooperating with other marxist-leninist groups, mainly ex-members of the Workers' Communist Party, on forming a new communist party. This initiative is called Communist Platform
Revolution was closed down in 2013, all information about the group is removed from the website.

References

External links
 

1987 establishments in Norway
Communist parties in Norway
Anti-revisionist organizations
Stalinist parties
Hoxhaist parties
Far-left politics in Norway
International Conference of Marxist–Leninist Parties and Organizations (Unity & Struggle)
Political parties established in 1987